The 2000 Asian Beach Volleyball Championships was a beach volleyball event, that was held from August 18 to 20, 2000 in Yangjiang, China. The event serves as the inaugural edition of the Asian Beach Volleyball Championships.

35 teams participated in the competition, Craig Seuseu and Lefu Leaupepe from New Zealand won the men's gold medal while Fu Lingli and Lan Hong from the host nation won the women's title.

Medal summary

References

External links
AVC Men's Results
AVC Women's Results

Asian Championships
Beach volleyball
Beach volleyball
Asian Beach Volleyball Championship